Hierodula sternosticta is a species of praying mantis in the family Mantidae.

Subspecies
These two subspecies belong to the species Hierodula sternosticta:
 Hierodula sternosticta coxalis Werner, 1932
 Hierodula sternosticta sternosticta Wood-Mason, 1882

References

sternosticta
Articles created by Qbugbot
Insects described in 1882